Adeline is a feminine given name meaning 'noble' or 'nobility'. It is of German origin and derived from Old High German "adal" which means noble. It lives on in the Modern High German words Adel (nobility), edel (noble) adelig (noble). It is a related to Adèle. Adeline was introduced to England by the Normans in the 11th century and was very common in the Middle Ages. Its variants include Adelin, Adelina, Adaline, Adalyn, Adalynn, Adelyn, Adalene, Adeleine, Aada, Ada, Alina, Aline, Adelita and Alita, Zélie.

Notable people with the name include:

 Adeline Pond Adams (1859–1948), American writer and wife of Herbert Adams
 Adeline, Countess of Cardigan and Lancastre (1825–1915), wife of James Brudenell, 7th Earl of Cardigan
 Adeline André, French fashion designer and the head of one of the ten haute couture design houses in Paris
 Adeline Canac (born 1990), French pair skater, currently skating with Yannick Bonheur
 Adeline Genée DBE (1878–1970), Danish/British ballet dancer
 Adeline Geo-Karis (1918–2008), Republican politician and a member of the Illinois Senate for the 31st District
 Adeline Hazan (born 1956), French politician, MEP for the east of France, and mayor of Reims since March 2008
 Adeline Kerrar (1924–1995), infielder and catcher, played in the All-American Girls Professional Baseball League in 1944
 Adeline Knapp (1860–1909), American journalist, author, social activist, environmentalist and educator
 Adeline Masquelier (born 1960), Associate Professor of Anthropology at Tulane University in New Orleans, Louisiana
 Adeline McKinlay, American tennis player of the end of the 19th century
 Adeline Miller, alias Adeline Furman, American madam and prostitute
 Adeline Rittershaus (1876–1924), philologist, a scholar in old Scandinavian literature, and champion for the equality of women
 Frances Adeline "Fanny" Seward (1844–1866), daughter of United States Secretary of State William H. Seward
 Frances Adeline Seward (1805–1865), born in 1805, the daughter of Judge Elijah Miller and Hannah Foote Miller
 Louise Adeline Weitzel (1862–1934), German-American writer
 Adeline Dutton Train Whitney (1824–1906), American poet and writer of books for girls
 Adeline Virginia Woolf (1882–1941), British modernist author
 Adeline Wuillème (born 1975), French foil fencer who competed in three Olympic games
 Adeline Yen Mah, Chinese-American author and physician
 Lisa Adeline Mainiero, American writer and management professor

References 

Feminine given names